Elections were held on November 2, 2010, to determine Georgia's 13 members of the United States House of Representatives. Representatives were elected for two-year terms to serve in the 112th United States Congress from January 3, 2011, until January 3, 2013. Primary elections were held on July 20, 2010, and primary runoff elections were held on August 10, 2010.

Of the 13 elections, the races in the 2nd and 8th districts were rated as competitive by CQ Politics, The Rothenberg Political Report, and Sabato's Crystal Ball, and the 2nd, 8th and 12th districts were rated as competitive by The Cook Political Report. Of Georgia's thirteen incumbents, eleven were re-elected, while one (John Linder of the 7th district) did not seek re-election and one (Jim Marshall of the 8th district) unsuccessfully sought re-election.

In total, eight Republicans and five Democrats were elected. A total of 2,468,680 votes were cast, of which 1,528,142 (61.90 percent) were for Republican candidates, 940,347 (38.09 percent) were for Democratic candidates and 191 (0.01 percent) were for write-in candidates.

Overview

By district
Results of the 2010 United States House of Representatives elections in Georgia by district:

District 1 

The 1st district included Hinesville and parts of Savannah and Valdosta. The district's population was 68 percent white, 24 percent black and 5 percent Hispanic (see Race and ethnicity in the United States Census); 82 percent were high school graduates and 19 percent had received a bachelor's degree or higher. Its median income was $43,481. In the 2008 presidential election the district gave 62 percent of its vote to Republican nominee John McCain and 37 percent to Democratic nominee Barack Obama.

Republican Jack Kingston, who took office in 1993, was the incumbent. Kingston was re-elected in 2008 with 67 percent of the vote. In 2010 Kingston's opponent in the general election was Democratic nominee Oscar Harris II, a farmer. Both Kingston and Harris were unopposed in their respective primaries.

Kingston raised $1,029,117 and spent $759,470. Prior to the election FiveThirtyEights forecast gave Kingston a 100 chance of winning and projected that he would receive 71 percent of the vote to Harris's 27 percent. On election day Kingston was re-elected with 72 percent of the vote to Harris's 28 percent. Kingston was again re-elected in 2012 and unsuccessfully ran for the U.S. Senate rather than seeking re-election in 2014. He was succeeded by fellow Republican Buddy Carter.

 General election results 

 
 
 
 

 External links 
 
 

 District 2 

The 2nd district included Albany, Columbus and Thomasville. The district's population was 47 percent black and 47 percent white (see Race and ethnicity in the United States Census); 77 percent were high school graduates and 15 percent had received a bachelor's degree or higher. Its median income was $34,860. In the 2008 presidential election the district gave 54 percent of its vote to Democratic nominee Barack Obama and 45 percent to Republican nominee John McCain. In 2010 the district had a Cook Partisan Voting Index of D+1.

Democrat Sanford Bishop, who took office in 1993, was the incumbent. Bishop was re-elected in 2008 with 69 percent of the vote. In 2010 Bishop's opponent in the general election was Republican nominee Mike Keown, a member of the Georgia House of Representatives. Bishop was unopposed for the Democratic nomination. Rick Allen, a medical supply businessman; and Lee Ferrell, a retired staff sergeant, also sought the Republican nomination.

Bishop raised $1,485,600 and spent $1,776,500. Keown raised $1,213,707 and spent $1,154,740. Allen raised $11,166 and spent $9,754. Ferrell raised $15,260 and spent $11,120.

An August 2010 poll by Public Opinion Strategies (POS) found Bishop leading with 50 percent to Keown's 44 percent. In a poll of 400 likely voters, conducted by POS on September 27 and 28, 2010, Bishop led with 47 percent to Keown's 46 percent while 7 percent were undecided. In a poll of 500 likely voters, conducted by Lester & Associates for Bishop's campaign between October 7 and 10, 2010, 50 percent supported Bishop while 40 percent favored Keown and 10 percent were undecided. A poll with a sample size of 836, conducted on October 19, 2010, by Landmark Communications, Inc. (LCI), found Keown leading with 47 percent to Bishop's 45 percent while 8 percent were undecided. An LCI poll with a sample size of 914, conducted on October 27, 2010, found Keown had the support of 50 percent while 46 percent backed Bishop and 4 percent were undecided.

Sabato's Crystal Ball rated the race as "leans Republican". In October 2010, The Cook Political Report rated the race as a "toss up" and CQ Politics rated the race as a "tossup". In November 2010, The Rothenberg Political Report rated the race as "lean Democrat". Prior to the election FiveThirtyEights forecast gave Keown a 60 percent chance of winning and projected that he would receive 51 percent of the vote to Bishop's 49 percent.

On election day Bishop was re-elected with 51 percent of the vote to Keown's 49 percent. Bishop was again re-elected in 2012, 2014, 2016, 2018, and 2020. Keown unsuccessfully ran for a seat in the Georgia State Senate in 2013. Allen was elected as the U.S. representative for the 12th district in 2014.

 Republican primary results 

 
 
 
 
 

 General election results 

 
 
 
 

 External links 
 Campaign websites 
 
 
 
 

 Further reading 
 

 District 3 

The 3rd district included Newnan, Peachtree City and part of Columbus. The district's population was 70 percent white and 23 percent black (see Race and ethnicity in the United States Census); 85 percent were high school graduates and 24 percent had received a bachelor's degree or higher. Its median income was $56,489. In the 2008 presidential election the district gave 64 percent of its vote to Republican nominee John McCain and 35 percent to Democratic nominee Barack Obama.

Republican Lynn Westmoreland, who took office in 2005, was the incumbent. Westmoreland was re-elected in 2008 with 66 percent of the vote. In April 2009, Westmoreland's press secretary said the congressman was considering running for Governor of Georgia; however later that month he said he would instead seek re-election. In 2010 Westmoreland's opponent in the general election was Democratic nominee Frank Saunders, a schoolteacher. Jagdish Agrawal also ran as a write-in candidate. Westmoreland and Saunders were unopposed in their respective primaries.

Westmoreland raised $785,044 and spent $712,529. Saunders raised $44,112 and spent $43,282. Prior to the election FiveThirtyEight's forecast gave Westmoreland a 100 percent chance of winning and projected that he would receive 70 percent of the vote to Saunders's 27 percent. On election day Westmoreland was re-elected with 69 to Saunders's 31 percent. Westmoreland was again re-elected in 2012 and 2014. He did not seek re-election in 2016 and was succeeded by fellow Republican Drew Ferguson.

 General election results 

 
 
 
 
 

 External links 
 
 

 District 4 

The 4th district included North Atlanta, Redan and Tucker. The district's population was 55 percent black, 24 percent white, 15 percent Hispanic and 5 percent Asian (see Race and ethnicity in the United States Census); 84 percent were high school graduates and 30 percent had received a bachelor's degree or higher. Its median income was $50,222. In the 2008 presidential election the district gave 79 percent of its vote to Democratic nominee Barack Obama and 20 percent to Republican nominee John McCain.

Democrat Hank Johnson, who took office in 2007, was the incumbent. Johnson was re-elected unopposed in 2008. In 2010 Johnson's opponent in the general election was Republican nominee Lisbeth Carter, a consultant.

Vernon Jones, the former chief executive officer of DeKalb County; and Connie Stokes, a DeKalb County Commissioner, also sought the Democratic nomination. Lee May, also a DeKalb County Commissioner, announced in February 2010 that he would not run in the Democratic primary. In a poll of 400 likely Democratic primary voters, conducted by Lake Research Partners for Johnson's campaign between January 14 and 20, 2010, Johnson led with 47 percent to Jones's 19 percent while Stokes had the support of 12 percent, 5 percent favored May, and 15 percent were undecided. Victor Armendariz, a publishing salesman; Larry Gause, a retired officer in the U.S. Navy; and Cory Ruth, an information security manager, also sought the Republican nomination.

Johnson raised $581,545 and spent $589,780. Carter raised $118,102 and spent the same amount. Jones raised $73,225 and spent $74,405. Stokes raised $78,668 and spent $78,629. Gause raised $3,997 and spent $2,931. Ruth raised $12,626 and spent $12,398.

Prior to the election FiveThirtyEight's forecast gave Johnson a 100 percent chance of winning and projected that he would receive 74 percent of the vote to Carter's 23 percent. On election day Johnson was re-elected with 75 percent of the vote to Carter's 25 percent. Johnson was again re-elected in 2012, 2014, 2016 and 2018.

 Democratic primary results 

 
 
 
 
 

 Republican primary results 

 
 
 
 
 
 

 General election results 

 
 
 
 

 External links 
 
 
 
 

 District 5 

The 5th district included Atlanta and parts of East Point and Sandy Springs. The district's population was 50 percent black, 38 percent white and 8 percent Hispanic (see Race and ethnicity in the United States Census); 85 percent were high school graduates and 43 percent had received a bachelor's degree or higher. Its median income was $50,072. In the 2008 presidential election the district gave 79 percent of its vote to Democratic nominee Barack Obama and 20 percent to Republican nominee John McCain.

Democrat John Lewis was the incumbent. Lewis was re-elected unopposed in 2008. In 2010 Lewis's opponent in the general election was Fenn Little, a civil rights attorney and small business owner. Kelly Nguyen, a graphic artist, also sought the Republican nomination.

Lewis raised $1,013,992 and spent $1,115,868. Little raised $107,759 and spent $92,206. Nguyen raised $13,433 and spent $14,436.

Prior to the election FiveThirtyEights forecast gave Lewis a 100 percent chance of winning and projected that he would receive 75 percent of the vote to Little's 22 percent. On election day Lewis was re-elected with 74 percent of the vote to Little's 26 percent. Lewis was again re-elected in 2012, 2014, 2016 and 2018.

 Republican primary results 

 
 
 
 

 General election results 

 
 
 
 

 External links 
 
 
 

 District 6 

 
The 6th district included Alpharetta, Dunwoody, Johns Creek, Roswell and part of Sandy Springs. The district's population was 74 percent white, 9 percent black, 9 percent Hispanic and 6 percent Asian (see Race and ethnicity in the United States Census); 94 percent were high school graduates and 53 percent had received a bachelor's degree or higher. Its median income was $82,593. In the 2008 presidential election the district gave 63 percent of its vote to Republican nominee John McCain and 35 percent to Democratic nominee Barack Obama.
 
Republican Tom Price, who took office in 2005, was the incumbent. Price was re-elected in 2008 with 69 percent of the vote. In 2010 Price was the only candidate on the ballot in the 6th district; however write-in candidate Sean Greenberg, a bartender, also ran.

Price raised $2,070,230 and spent $1,218,835. Prior to the election ''FiveThirtyEights forecast gave Price a 100 percent chance of winning. On election day Price was re-elected with 100 percent of the vote. Price was again re-elected in 2012, 2014 and 2016, and remained in office until February 2017, when he was confirmed as U.S. Secretary of Health and Human Services, a position from which he resigned in September 2017. He was succeeded by fellow Republican Karen Handel.

 General election results 

 
 
 
 

 External links 
 

 District 7 

The 7th district included Duluth and Lawrenceville. The district's population was 60 percent white, 19 percent black, 11 percent Hispanic and 8 percent Asian (see Race and ethnicity in the United States Census); 87 percent were high school graduates and 34 percent had received a bachelor's degree or higher. Its median income was $67,059. In the 2008 presidential election the district gave 60 percent of its vote to Republican nominee John McCain and 39 percent to Democratic nominee Barack Obama.

Republican John Linder, who took office in 1993, was the incumbent. Linder was re-elected in 2008 with 62 percent of the vote. In 2010 Linder retired rather than seeking re-election. The candidates in the general election were Republican nominee Rob Woodall, Linder's former chief of staff; and Democratic nominee Doug Heckman, a financial services manager. Clay Cox, a member of the Georgia House of Representatives; Chuck Efstration, an assistant district attorney in Gwinnett County; Jef Fincher, a small business owner and flight attendant; Ronnie Grist, a retired employee of the state government; Jody Hice, a radio talk show host and former pastor; Tom Kirby, a human resource safety manager; and Tom Parrott, a salesman and former accountant, also sought the Republican nomination.

In February 2010, a consultant for Karen Handel, a former Secretary of State of Georgia, said Handel would not seek the Republican nomination in the 7th district and would instead remain a candidate in the gubernatorial election. The same month John Smoltz, a former Atlanta Braves pitcher, said he would not seek the Republican nomination. In March 2010, Ralph Reed, the former executive director of the Christian Coalition of America, said he would not run. David Shafer, a member of the Georgia State Senate who had considered seeking the Republican nomination, announced in March 2010 that he would not run. Don Balfour, also a member of the State Senate, announced that he would run in March 2010, but later that month ended his campaign.

Woodall and Hice advanced to the primary runoff election. In a poll of the runoff, conducted on August 28, 2010, by Landmark Communications, Inc. (LCI) with a sample size of 789, Woodall led with 47 percent to Hice's 32 percent while 20 percent were undecided. Heckman was unopposed in the Democratic primary.

Woodall raised $399,086 and spent $323,801. Heckman raised $81,220 and spent $73,899. Cox raised $287,336 and spent $286,474. Efstration raised $56,214 and spent $54,102. Fincher raised $33,100 and spent the same amount. Hice raised $279,017 and spent $278,566. Kirby raised $5,925 and spent $8,122. Parrott raised $17,475 and spent $14,515.

In a poll of 1,070 likely voters, conducted by LCI on October 25, 2010, Woodall led with 60 percent to Heckman's 30 percent. Prior to the election FiveThirtyEights forecast gave Woodall a 100 percent chance of winning and projected that he would receive 68 percent of the vote to Heckman's 32 percent. On election day Woodall was elected with 67 percent of the vote to Heckman's 33 percent. Woodall was re-elected in 2012, 2014, 2016 and 2018. Hice was elected as the U.S. representative for the 10th district in 2014 and was re-elected in 2016 and 2018.

 Republican primary results 

 
 
 
 
 
 
 
 
 
 

 Republican primary runoff results 

 
 
 
 

 General election results 

 
 
 
 

 External links 
 
 
 
 
 
 
 
 

 District 8 

The 8th district included Macon and part of Warner Robins. The district's population was 61 percent white and 33 percent black (see Race and ethnicity in the United States Census); 79 percent were high school graduates and 18 percent had received a bachelor's degree or higher. Its median income was $42,697. In the 2008 presidential election the district gave 56 percent of its vote to Republican nominee John McCain and 43 percent to Democratic nominee Barack Obama. In 2010 the district had a Cook Partisan Voting Index of R+10.

Democrat Jim Marshall, who took office in 2003, was the incumbent. Marshall was re-elected in 2008 with 57 percent of the vote. In 2010 Marshall's opponent in the general election was Republican nominee Austin Scott, a member of the Georgia House of Representatives. Marshall was unopposed in the Democratic primary. Ken DeLoach, a school administrator; and Diane Vann, a former nurse, also sought the Republican nomination. Paul Rish, the former head of the Bibb County Republican Party, ended his campaign in April 2010. Angela Hicks, a businesswoman, ended her campaign for the Republican nomination in May 2010.

Marshall raised $1,496,152 and spent $1,814,549. Scott raised $1,035,300 and spent $1,024,631. DeLoach raised $30,941 and spent the same amount. Vann raised no money and spent $17,293. Hicks raised $78,171 and spent the same amount.

In a poll conducted by American Viewpoint (AV) for Scott's campaign in late July 2010, Marshall led with 44 percent to Scott's 39 percent. A poll of 400 likely voters, conducted by Grove Insight for the Democratic Congressional Campaign Committee between September 13 and 15, 2010, Marshall led with 48 percent to Scott's 36 percent. An AV poll of 300 likely voters, conducted on September 26 and 27, 2010, and released by Scott's campaign, found Scott leading with 46 percent to Marshall's 38 percent. In a poll of 400 likely voters, conducted by the Mellman Group between October 17 and 19, 2010, 47 percent of respondents supported Marshall while 44 percent favored Scott and 9 percent were undecided. A poll conducted by Landmark Communications, Inc. (LCI) on October 19, 2010, with a sample size of 763, found Scott leading with 54 percent to Marshall's 35 percent, while 14 percent were undecided. In a poll of 400 likely voters, conducted by Penn Schoen Berland between October 19 and 21, 2010, Scott led with 50 percent to Marshall's 37 percent while 10 percent were undecided. In a poll of 1,133 likely voters, conducted by LCI on October 26, 2010, Scott led with 53 percent to Marshall's 39 percent.Sabato's Crystal Ball rated the race as "leans Republican". In October 2010, The Cook Political Report rated the race as a "toss up" and CQ Politics rated the race as a "tossup". In November 2010, The Rothenberg Political Report rated the race as "lean Republican". Prior to the election FiveThirtyEights forecast gave Scott a 94 percent chance of winning and projected that he would receive 56 percent of the vote to Marshall's 44 percent.

On election day Scott was elected with 53 percent of the vote to Marshall's 47 percent. Scott was re-elected in 2012, 2014, 2016 and 2018. In 2012 Marshall became president and chief executive officer of the United States Institute of Peace, stepping down in January 2014.

 Republican primary results 

 
 
 
 
 

 General election results 

 
 
 
 

 External links 
 
 
 
 

 District 9 

The 9th district included Dalton and Gainesville. The district's population was 81 percent white and 13 percent Hispanic (see Race and ethnicity in the United States Census); 77 percent were high school graduates and 20 percent had received a bachelor's degree or higher. Its median income was $49,065. In the 2008 presidential election the district gave 75 percent of its vote to Republican nominee John McCain and 23 percent to Democratic nominee Barack Obama.

Republican Tom Graves, who was elected in a June 2010 special election, was the incumbent. He succeeded fellow Republican Nathan Deal, who was re-elected with 76 percent of the vote in 2008. In the November 2010 general election, Graves was unopposed for re-election.

Lee Hawkins, a former member of the Georgia State Senate; Bobby Reese, a member of the Georgia House of Representatives; and Steve Tarvin also sought the Republican nomination. Chris Cates and Bert Loftman, a neurosurgeon; withdrew from the race before the primary but remained on the Republican primary ballot. Bill Stephens, the former majority leader of the State Senate, ended his campaign in May 2010. As in the special election, Graves and Hawkins advanced to the primary runoff election, which marked the fourth time the two men faced one another for the seat in 2010. Mike Freeman, a retired pastor, announced in April 2010 that he would not seek the Democratic nomination.

Across both elections, Graves raised $1,312,938 and spent $1,309,824. Hawkins raised $1,025,707 and spent $1,023,928. Reese raised $23,991 and spent $21,076. Tarvin raised $450,327 and spent $447,891. Cates raised $483,218 and spent $482,774. Loftman raised $18,405 and reported spending $-10,190. Stephens raised $114,908 and spent the same amount. Freeman raised $37,973 and spent the same amount. Graves was again re-elected in 2012, 2014, 2016 and 2018.

 Republican primary results 

 
 
 
 
 
 
 
 

 Republican primary runoff results 

 
 
 
 

 External links 
 
 
 
 
 

 District 10 

The 10th district included Athens-Clarke, Martinez and Augusta-Richmond. The district's population was 73 percent white, 19 percent black and 5 percent Hispanic (see Race and ethnicity in the United States); 81 percent were high school graduates and 24 percent had received a bachelor's degree or higher. Its median income was $43,135. In the 2008 presidential election the district gave 62 percent of its vote to Republican nominee John McCain and 37 percent to Democratic nominee Barack Obama.

Republican Paul Broun, who took office in 2007, was the incumbent. Broun was re-elected in 2008 with 61 percent of the vote. In 2010 Broun's opponent in the general election was Russell Edwards, a law student and former teacher. Broun and Edwards were unopposed in their respective primaries.

Broun raised $2,032,417 and spent $1,831,081. Edwards raised $220,662 and spent $218,078. Prior to the election FiveThirtyEights forecast gave Broun a 100 percent chance of winning and projected that he would receive 67 percent of the vote to Edwards's 31 percent. On election day Broun was re-elected with 67 percent of the vote to Edwards's 33 percent. Broun was again re-elected in 2012 and unsuccessfully ran for the U.S. Senate rather than seeking re-election in 2014. He was succeeded by fellow Republican Jody Hice.

 General election results 

 
 
 
 

 External links 
 
 

 District 11 

The 11th district included Kennesaw, Rome and part of Marietta. The district's population was 75 percent white, 14 percent black and 8 percent Hispanic (see Race and ethnicity in the United States Census); 82 percent were high school graduates and 24 percent had received a bachelor's degree or higher. Its median income was $53,784. In the 2008 presidential election the district gave 66 percent of its vote to Republican nominee John McCain and 33 percent to Democratic nominee Barack Obama.

Republican Phil Gingrey, who took office in 2003, was the incumbent. Gingrey was re-elected in 2008 with 68 percent of the vote. In 2010 Gingrey was unopposed for re-election. Gingrey raised $1,389,039 and spent $920,811. Gingrey was again re-elected in 2012 and unsuccessfully ran for the U.S. Senate rather than seeking re-election in 2014. He was succeeded by fellow Republican Barry Loudermilk.

 External links 
 

 District 12 

The 12th district included Statesboro and parts of Augusta-Richmond and Savannah. The district's population was 50 percent white and 44 percent black (see Race and ethnicity in the United States); 78 percent were high school graduates and 16 percent had received a bachelor's degree or higher. Its median income was $36,643. In the 2008 presidential election the district gave 54 percent of its vote to Democratic nominee Barack Obama and 45 percent to Republican nominee John McCain. In 2010 the district had a Cook Partisan Voting Index of D+1.

Democrat John Barrow, who took office in 2005, was the incumbent. Barrow was re-elected in 2008 with 66 percent of the vote. In 2010 his opponent in the general election was Republican nominee Ray McKinney, a project manager for nuclear power plants.

Regina Thomas, a former member of the Georgia State Senate, also sought the Democratic nomination. Thomas also planned to run as a write-in candidate in the general election, but in August 2010 the office of the Secretary of State of Georgia ruled that she was ineligible to do so. In March 2010, John McArdle of CQ Politics wrote that the name of Michael Thurmond, the state Labor Commissioner, was "being floated by Georgia insiders" as a potential candidate in the Democratic primary; however in April 2010, Thurmond announced he would run for the U.S. Senate. Lester Jackson, another member of the State Senate, said in April 2010 that he would seek re-election rather than challenging Barrow for the Democratic nomination.

Mike Horner, a retired U.S. Air Force officer and banker; Jeanne Seaver, an activist; and Carl Smith, the fire chief of Thunderbolt, also sought the Republican nomination. Wayne Mosley, a doctor and former U.S. Army lieutenant colonel, ended his campaign for the Republican nomination in October 2009. McKinney and Smith advanced to the primary runoff election.

Barrow raised $1,951,721 and spent $1,905,568. McKinney raised $250,534 and spent $246,792. Thomas raised $48,353 and spent $46,311. Horner raised $13,865 and spent $13,782. Seaver raised $43,022 and spent $42,960. Smith raised $72,085 and spent $71,987. Mosley raised $29,470 and spent the same amount.

In October 2010, The Cook Political Report rated the race as "likely Democratic". The same month John Fund of The Wall Street Journal included the race as one of "five races that could deliver upset victories", on grounds that the district had voted for George W. Bush in the 2004 presidential election. Prior to the election FiveThirtyEight'''s forecast gave Barrow a 100 percent chance of winning and projected that he would receive 60 percent of the vote to McKinney's 38 percent. On election day Barrow was re-elected with 57 percent of the vote to McKinney's 43 percent. Barrow was again re-elected in 2012 and unsuccessfully sought re-election in 2014. He was succeeded by Republican Rick Allen.

 Democratic primary results 

 
 
 
 

 Republican primary results 

 
 
 
 
 
 

 Republican primary runoff results 

 
 
 
 

 General election results 

 
 
 
 

 External links 
 
 
 
 
 

 District 13 

The 13th district included Mableton and part of Smyrna. The district's population was 53 percent black, 31 percent white and 11 percent Hispanic (see Race and ethnicity in the United States); 85 percent were high school graduates and 25 percent had received a bachelor's degree or higher. Its median income was $51,398. In the 2008 presidential election the district gave 72 percent of its vote to Democratic nominee Barack Obama and 27 percent to Republican nominee John McCain.

Democrat David Scott, who took office in 2003, was the incumbent. Scott was re-elected in 2008 with 69 percent of the vote. In 2010 Scott's opponent in the general election was Republican nominee Mike Crane, a general contractor.

Michael Frisbee and Mike Murphy also sought the Democratic nomination. Hank Dudek, a regional account manager for a background screening company; Chip Flanegan, a small business owner; Deborah Honeycutt, a medical director at Clayton State University Health Services; Dave Orr, a food and restaurant business manager; and Rupert Parchment, the owner of Decor Moving Services, also sought the Republican nomination. Crane and Honeycutt advanced to the primary runoff election.

Scott raised $862,262 and spent $811,744. Crane raised $147,199 and spent $143,214. Frisbee raised $6,751 and spent $6,509. Murphy raised $12,435 and spent $13,670. Dudek raised $8,196 and spent $8,790. Flanegan raised $49,400 and spent $47,112. Honeycutt raised $196,736 and spent $278,163. Orr raised $10,519 and spent $10,518. Parchment raised $17,363 and spent $16,900.

Prior to the election FiveThirtyEights forecast gave Scott a 100 percent chance of winning and projected that he would receive 63 percent of the vote to Crane's 35 percent. On election day Scott was re-elected with 69 percent of the vote to Crane's 31 percent. Scott was one of eight Democratic U.S. Representatives who were elected by a greater margin in 2010 than in 2008. Scott was again re-elected in 2012, 2014, 2016 and 2018. In December 2011, Crane won a seat in the Georgia State Senate.

Democratic primary results

Republican primary results

Republican primary runoff results

General election results

External links

See also
 List of United States representatives from Georgia
 United States congressional delegations from Georgia

References

House
Georgia
2010